Wat Pu Pia ("Temple of Old Man Pia") is a semi ruined temple in the Wiang Kum Kam archaeological complex, outside of modern Chiang Mai in northern Thailand. It is notable within the archaeological area inside Wiang Kum Kam for its relatively good state of preservation, including some remnants of stucco work and an intact layout.

See also
Wiang Kum Kam

References

 Oliver Hargreave: Exploring Chiang Mai, City, Valley & Mountains. Within Books, 4th Edition, 2013. 

Pu Pia
History of Chiang Mai